Anjan Das (17 November 1949 – 2 June 2014) was a critically acclaimed Indian film director. He was known for creating "Poetry on Celluloid", a tag that was designated by the critics post his lyrical masterpiece Saanjhbatir Roopkathara (Strokes & Silhouettes, 2002). He was awarded with National Film Award for Best Film on Family Welfare for Faltu (The Saga of Ranirghat, 2006). His films have won numerous Bengal Film Journalists' Association Awards and were regularly showcased at A-list film festivals all over the world.

Career
Winner of two national awards and multiple international awards, Das started his film career in the mid-1970s with two documentaries named The Art of Anant Malakar and Tripura. His first feature was Sainik (Soldier). The film was shown at various international film festivals, including Berlinale, in 1976. Other festivals were Mannheim, Tehran and Kraków in countries like Mongolia and Yugoslavia, and it was invited to San Remo Film Competition in Italy.

In 2001, he made the feature film Saanjhbatir Roopkathara (Strokes & Silhouettes, 2002). It was the first regional film in history to be picked up by Hollywood Kingpin Columbia Tristar (now Sony Pictures) for distribution. The film was showcased at several international film festivals including the Montreal World Film Festival, BFI London Film Festival, International Film Festival Rotterdam in Rome, Edmonton, Madrid, Singapore, etc. The film was chosen as one of the seven best films of that year at BFI London Film Festival. Then came the feature film Iti Srikanta (Yours Truly, Srikanta), which won the National Award for Best Audiography in 2004. It was shown under the Indian Panorama at International Film Festival of India 2004 and had its International Premiere at International Film Festival Rotterdam. The film was showcased at various other international film festivals such as Edinburgh, Kerala, Brisbane, Singapore, and Commonwealth Film Festival.

In 2006, he made the film Faltu (The Saga of Ranirghat, 2006), which also did its usual round of festivals and fetched him the National Film Award for Best Feature Film on Family Welfare. In 2007, he made Jara Bristite Bhijechhilo (Drenched... in the rain), for which he won the Special Director's Award at Almaty, Kazakhstan, and two awards in Madrid, Spain: Best Actress and Special Jury Award for the Director. This film also was an entry in the Indian Panorama of International Film Festival of India 2007.

He won 11 Bengal Film Journalists' Association Awards for the last three films. He made a documentary on the rebel poet Kazi Nazrul Islam, produced by the Ministry of External Affairs, Government of India and was inaugurated by the then External Affairs minister, Pranab Mukherjee at a function at Habitat Centre, New Delhi.

Thereafter, he also made a few documentaries produced by PSBT and Films Division, which include Maa Durga (on goddess Durga) and Flow & Ebb (on the boatmen of Bengal). His feature film Swarger Nichey Manush (People under Heaven) starring Rituparna Sengupta was showcased at various film festivals like Mumbai Film Festival, Osian's Cinefan Festival of Asian and Arab Cinema, etc. but is still awaiting commercial release. Incidentally, all the above films were shown at Osian's Cinefan Festival of Asian and Arab Cinema, perhaps the largest showcase of films in India.

His very popular film Achin Pakhi (A Love Story) had its International Premiere at Cairo International film Festival 2010 and World Premiere under Indian Panorama at International Film Festival of India 2010. His next film Banshiwala (The Flautist), based on Shirshendu Mukhopadhyay's novel of the same name, was highly acclaimed by the critics and won 2 international awards - Golden Kahuna Award at Honolulu Film Awards 2011 and Bronze Palm Award at Mexico International Film Festival 2011. It was also showcased at New Jersey International Film Festival. His next Bedeni (The Snake-Charmer's Wife) was based on Tarashankar Bandopadhyay's novel and starred Rituparna Sengupta in a challenging role for which she earned widespread acclaim.

His last film Ajana Batas (The Mystic Wind) starring Paoli Dam and based on Joy Goswami's novel, had its World Premiere at International Film Festival of India 2013 (Indian Panorama). It also won him the Bronze Palm Award at Mexico International Film Festival 2014. It was officially selected (in competition) at Washington DC South Asian Film Festival 2014, Indian International Film Festival of Queensland 2014, and FerFilm Festival 2015. It competed for the Conchshell Award at Belize International Film Festival 2014. The film garnered critical acclaim and was released commercially nine months after his demise.

Anjan Das' trademark was that all his films were based on literature. Three of his films are based on eminent poet Joy Goswami's novels. All his films are labelled as lyrical and poetic.

Filmography

Director
 Sainik (1976)
 Saanjhbatir Roopkathara (2002)
 Iti Srikanta  (2004)
 Faltu  (2005)
 Jara Bristite Bhijechhilo (2007)
 Achin Pakhi (2010); 
  Banshiwala (2010)
 Bedeni (2011)
 Ajana Batas (2014)
Swarger Nichey Manush

Producer
 Disarray (2012) (short film)

Writer
 Faltu  (2005)
 Banshiwala (2010)
 Ajana Batas (2014)

See also
 Sekhar Das

References

External links
 

2014 deaths
Bengali film directors
Bengali Hindus
Film directors from Kolkata
1949 births
21st-century Indian film directors
Directors who won the Best Film on Family Welfare National Film Award